Princess Street is a road in south Mumbai, India. The official name of this road is Samaldas Gandhi Marg, named after the Indian freedom fighter who had led the Arzi Hukumat (Temporary Government) of the erstwhile princely state of Junagadh in 1947. The road links the Marine Drive flyover with Crawford Market, and is known for its shops selling chemicals, medicines and medical equipment. It serves the busy Marine Lines railway station as well as the adjoining localities of Thakurdwar and Bhuleshwar to its north and Dhobitalao to its south.

References 

Neighbourhoods in Mumbai
Streets in Mumbai
Retail markets in Mumbai